Isimila Stone Age Site (Eneo la Kale la Isimila in Swahili ) is pre-historic settlement located inside Iringa District of Iringa Region in Tanzania. The  site is home to the Middle Pleistocene archaeological site. Large surface assemblages of later Acheulean lithics, including hand axes, cleavers, scrapers, and cores, have been found at the site. Although no human bones have been found at the location, Isimila provides a special view into Middle Pleistocene Hominid behavior. The site is a registered National Historic Site.

References

Iringa Region